House of Cards is an American political drama web television series created by Beau Willimon. It is an adaptation of the BBC's mini-series of the same name and is based on the novel by Michael Dobbs. All seasons have premiered on the streaming service Netflix.

In 2013, House of Cards became the first original online-only web television series to receive major nominations for the 65th Primetime Emmy Awards. The first episode, "Chapter 1", received four nominations becoming the first webisode (online-only episode) of a television series to receive a major Primetime Emmy Award nomination.
Eigil Bryld won Primetime Emmy Award for Outstanding Cinematography for a Single-Camera Series, meanwhile David Fincher won Outstanding Directing for a Drama Series. Both, Bryld and Fincher won for the episode "Chapter 1", making it the first Emmy-awarded webisode. The series has been nominated for a Primetime Emmy Award for Outstanding Drama Series during the ceremonies of 2013, 2014, 2015 and 2016. The first two seasons of House of Cards were nominated for a Golden Globe Award for Best Television Series – Drama.

For her work in House of Cards, Robin Wright won a Golden Globe and Satellite Award in the category Best Actress in a Drama Series. She was Netflix's first awarded person in major acting categories. Wright's Golden Globe Award for Best Actress – Television Series Drama for her portrayal of Claire Underwood made her the first actress to win a Golden Globe Award for an online-only web television series. She also earned an Outstanding Lead Actress in a Drama Series nomination at the 65th, 66th, 67th, 68th, 69th, and 71st Primetime Emmy Awards. In the role of Frank Underwood and as producer of House of Cards, Kevin Spacey was nominated for the Golden Globe in the 2014 and 2015 ceremony. During the 2015, Spacey, won the Golden Globe Award for Best Actor – Television Series Drama. He was nominated for a Primetime Emmy Award for Outstanding Lead Actor in a Drama Series five times. Later that year, Spacey won the Screen Actors Guild Award for Outstanding Performance by a Male Actor in a Drama Series.

Honorary awards

Major Associations

British Academy Television Awards

Golden Globes Awards

Irish Film & Television Academy Awards

Primetime Emmy Awards

Primetime Creative Arts Emmy Awards

Guilds

Art Directors Guild Awards

Directors Guild of America Awards

Location Managers Guild Awards

Makeup Artist and Hair Stylist Guild Awards

Producers Guild of America Awards

Screen Actors Guild Awards

Writers Guild of America Awards

Popular awards

EWwy Awards

IGN Awards

NewNowNext Awards

Online Film and Television Association Awards

People's Choice Awards

Other Associations

American Cinema Editors Awards

American Society of Cinematographers Awards

Artios Awards

Cinema Audio Society Awards

Critics' Choice Television Awards

Costume Designers Guild Awards

Golden Reel Awards

Golden Camera Awards

Hollywood Music in Media Awards

Hollywood Post Alliance Awards

NAACP Image Awards

Satellite Awards

Screenwriters Choice Awards

Television Critics Association Awards

Awards and nominations for the cast

See also
List of accolades received by Netflix

References

External links
 
 
 
 House of Cards at Emmys.com

House of Cards (American TV series)
House of Cards